Art Souterrain (otherwise known as underground art) is a non-profit organization which exhibits artworks in Montreal's underground city (Underground City, Montreal).

History 
The organization was founded in Montreal in 2009 by Frederic Loury who is the owner and founder of Galerie [sas]. http://www.galeriesas.com  Art Souterrain took first place in 2009 during the eighth edition of the Nuit Blanche, an activity part of Montreal High Lights Festival. For one night the public was welcomed to walk through Montreal's underground city and see over 80 artists' projects, including video (Video art), Performance art, Photography and Installation art. In the 2010 and 2011 editions, the projects remained the next two weeks after the Nuit Blanche.

In May 2010, Art Souterrain also participated to the Expo 2010 in Shanghai, China. At the expo 15 projects created by artists from Quebec were presented in a shopping center.

In 2010, Art Souterrain was given the award Best Event in Montreal City's Downtown by the Destination Centre-ville organism.

Description 
Art Souterrain's journey begins at the Place des Arts, and continues through the Complexe Desjardins, the Complexe Guy-Favreau, Montreal's International District (Quartier international de Montréal)( the Centre CDP Capital, the World Trade Centre Montreal and the Tour de la Bourse (Stock Exchange Tower), the Place de la Cité Internationale, the Place Bonaventure, the Place Ville-Marie, the Eaton Center (Centre Eaton) and the Complexe Les Ailes.

The artists

Notable artists who have participated:

2010 edition
Patrick Bérubé, Carole Baillargeon, Peter Gnass, Michael A. Robinson, Dominique Blain, Isabelle Hayeur, John Oswald, Damian Siquerios (Public's choice Award 2010), François Morelli, Yannick Guéguen, Jean-François Laporte, Mathieu Beauséjour, Isabelle Choinière, Manon de Pauw, Alana Riley.

2009 edition
BGL, Valérie Blass, Gwenaël Bélanger, Carlito Dalceggio, Cooke-Sasseville, Jérôme Fortin, Marc Séguin, Pascal Grandmaison.

References

Sources
 http://www.ratsdeville.typepad.com/ratsdeville/art-souterrain-2010-media-en.html

Footnotes

External links
 Official website

Contemporary art galleries in Canada
Public art
Organizations based in Montreal
Arts organizations based in Canada
2009 establishments in Quebec
Art galleries established in 2009